Bősárkány is a village in Győr-Moson-Sopron county, Hungary.

External links

  in Hungarian
 Street map

References 

Populated places in Győr-Moson-Sopron County